Sohail Sameer is a Pakistani actor who appears in television series and films. He began his career as child actor on PTV. He got a lot of recognition for his role as Nazakat Ali in Hum TV's 2018 romantic comedy Suno Chanda.

Filmography

Television

Film

Awards and nominations

|-
| style="text-align:center;"| 2012
| 
| Best Actor (Jury) award at 17th PTV Awards
|
|-
| style="text-align:center;"| 2012
| 
| Best Actor (Viewers) award at 17th PTV Awards
|
|-
|-
| style="text-align:center;"| 2012
| 
| Best Model (Lux Style Awards) award at 2006
|
|-
|-
| style="text-align:center;"| 2012
| 
| Best Model (Viewers) award at Face of the Year 2007
|
|-
| style="text-align:center;"| 2016
| Sartaj Mera Tu Raaj Mera
| Best Actor award at 4th Hum Awards
|
|-
| style="text-align:center;"| 2019
| Hak-Is Short Film Festival
| Best Actor award at leading Role
|

References

External links

Living people
Pakistani male film actors
Pakistani male television actors
Male actors from Lahore
Punjabi people
1980 births